Cylindrepomus mucronatus is a species of beetle in the family Cerambycidae. It was described by Schwarzer in 1926. It is known from the Philippines.

References

Dorcaschematini
Beetles described in 1926